Lincoln Junior and Senior High School or Lincoln Junior – Senior High School (LJSHS) can refer to:

Lincoln Junior - Senior High School (Indiana), Cambridge City, Indiana
 Lincoln Junior-Senior High School, Lincoln Unified School District 298, Lincoln, Kansas
 Lincoln Junior Senior High School, Ellwood City, Pennsylvania, Ellwood City Area School District
 Abraham Lincoln Junior and Senior High School (now Gregory-Lincoln Education Center), Houston, Texas
 Lincoln Junior-Senior High School, Alma Center, Wisconsin, Alma Center-Humbird-Merrillan School District

See also
Lincoln Junior High School (disambiguation)